Song for Chao Phraya (lit: "wife's younger sister") is a 1990 Thai drama film directed by Chatrichalerm Yukol. The film was selected as the Thai entry for the Best Foreign Language Film at the 62nd Academy Awards, but was not accepted as a nominee. It is a remake of the 1978 film of the same name.

Summary
Sang, a sand merchant who sells sand on the Chao Phraya River from Nakhon Sawan to Bangkok. Prang, his beautiful wife fled him to Bangkok to become the star in order to enhance the well-being of the family. So he cruised to Bangkok to find her when she refused, Sang was so upset that he drank and became a failure. When he was drunk, he tried to rape Tubtim his wife's younger sister, but she managed to escape. Finally became Prang, who is just a teenage girl who takes care of his little children and is the one who bears all the troubles.

Cast
 Chatchai Plengpanich as Sang
 Passorn Boonyakiart as Prang
 Pattamawan Kaomoolkadee as Tubtim

See also
 List of submissions to the 62nd Academy Awards for Best Foreign Language Film
 List of Thai submissions for the Academy Award for Best Foreign Language Film

References

External links
 

1990 films
1990 drama films
Thai drama films
Thai-language films
Films directed by Chatrichalerm Yukol